Nowhere Child may refer to:
Nowhere Child, a 2015 Novella by Rachel Abbott
"The Nowhere Child", a 1971 episode of TV series Medical Center

See also
"Ty, detinushka, sirotinushka" ("You, My Little Nowhere Child"), folk music by Vasily Fyodorovich Trutovsky (c. 1740 – c. 1810)